Kenneth Wayne Howard (born September 19, 1952) is an American faith leader, author, religion demographer, and nonprofit executive – currently executive director of The FaithX Project.

Early life and career
Born in Lubbock, Texas, Howard is the son of a Jewish mother and a gentile father, the grandson of Russian immigrants, and the great-grandson of the town rabbi of Mogilev, Belarus. In his early 20s he became a follower of Jesus and helped start a messianic synagogue, yet ultimately joined the Episcopal Church because it was "the most Jewish church" he could find.

Public Sector (1974–1989): Howard worked in the public behavior health and developmental services field in the Commonwealth of Virginia, from 1974–1981 for local community services boards, first as a volunteerism director, then community organizer, and from 1981–1989 as a training director for the Virginia Department of Behavioral Health and Developmental Services. 

Private Consulting Practice (1978–1993): In 1989, Howard started a consulting practice focusing on management development, rightsizing, team building, and board management for both private, public, and nonprofit sector organizations. He maintained this practice through his graduation from seminary in 1993.

Ordained Ministry
Seminary (1990–1993): Studied at Virginia Theological Seminary in Alexandria, Virginia, focusing on church history and biblical languages, and including international study in Biblical archeology at St. George's College, Jerusalem in Israel. Assisted in redesigning in the Introduction to the New Testament curriculum. Graduated in 1993 with honors in Church history for his research into the Jewish origins of early Christianity, published in Jewish Christianity in the Early Church.

Ordination (1993): Ordained as a deacon, then as a priest in the Episcopal Church in the Diocese of Washington. 

Parish Ministry (1993–2016): Served as assistant rector at the Episcopal Church of the Ascension in Gaithersburg, Maryland from 1991–1995, focusing on leadership development, spiritual formation, and stewardship. Left in 1995 to start a new congregation, St. Nicholas Church in Germantown, Maryland, the first successful new church start in the Diocese of Washington in over 30 years. By the time he left in 2016, the congregation had experienced more than ten-fold growth, purchased property for its eventual campus, and constructed its first multipurpose worship and gathering center. 

Faith-Based Nonprofit Ministry (2016–present): Howard stepped down from parish ministry in 2016 to start The FaithX Project, a 501(c)3 nonprofit consulting, resource development, and research practice, the mission of which is to help congregations survive and thrive in turbulent times through data-grounded discernment, vision-guided experimentation, and strategic mission planning. FaithX serves faith leaders and faith communities in all denominations and faith traditions. FaithX was instrumental in developing tools to assess congregational vitality and sustainability, and applying GIS demographics, analytics, and market segmentation to congregational, judicatory, and denominational planning. These include:
 Congregational Vitality Assessment – A 65-question, research-based congregational vitality inventory, developed by FaithX and co-sponsored by the Episcopal Church Foundation.
 MapDash for Faith Communities – An online, interactive demographic and analytic platform for congregations and judicatories. Howard served as subject matter expert and beta test coordinator for Datastory (the GIS company that developed it).

Paradoxy (2010): In 2010, Howard authored the book Paradoxy: Creating Christian Community Beyond Us and Them, the premise of which is to help congregations "transcend dead-end divisions and transform conflict into healthy diversity united by the love of Christ and the power of the Holy Spirit". Notable critical reviews of the book include the following:

 Phyllis Tickle, a leader in the Emerging Christianity movement, called Paradoxy "one of the clearest and most concise commentaries presently available about where the Church may reasonably be seen as going in this time of paradigmatic shift."
 Brian McLaren wrote in the book's foreword, "Ken Howard does what good leaders do in times of change and challenge. First, he describes where we are. Then he tells the story of how we got here. Then he gives us a vision of where to go from here [...] he simplifies without oversimplifying complex historical and philosophical developments."

Education
 2006 – Cambridge University, Cambridge, UK: Visiting Scholar on the history of the Early Church and Celtic Christianity.
 1993 – Virginia Theological Seminary, Alexandria, VA: Master of Divinity with honors in Church History.
 1989 – Virginia Commonwealth University, Richmond, VA: Master of Education, specializing in Human Resources Development.
 1979 – Old Dominion University, Norfolk, VA: Bachelor of Science in Interdisciplinary Studies (Education and Psychology).

Associations, Elections, and Appointments
 2017–present: International Positive Psychology Association – Work and Meaning SIG (chair 2017–2018)
 1993–present: Episcopal Diocese of Washington – Elected/appointed positions include: Task for Common Ground Dialogue on Human Sexuality (chair), Diocesan Council (Executive Committee), General Convention Delegate (alternate), Bishop's pastoral representative to troubled congregations, Bishop's Working Group on Mission Canons (chair), Bishop's Working Group on Episcopal-Jewish Relations (co-chair), Ecclesiastical Trial Court (member).
 2008–2015: Washington Episcopal Clergy Association – Elected positions include: Board Member, Vice President, Secretary, Communications Director, Program Chair.

Affiliations
 Episcopal Diocese of Washington – Howard serves as executive director of FaithX under an extension of ministry from the Diocese.
 Datastory – Howard acts as Subject Matter Expert (SME) and FaithX has an affiliate relation.
 Esri – FaithX is an Esri Partner organization.

Books
 "Paradoxy: Creating Christian Community Beyond Us and Them." Published by The FaithX Project (2016, 2nd Edition). , .
 "Excommunicating the Faithful: Jewish Christianity in the Early Church." Published by The FaithX Project (3rd Edition, 2013).

Publications
 "Grounding Discernment in Data: Strategic Missional Planning Using GIS Technology and Market Segmentation Data," Socio-Historical Exploration of Religion and Ministry (2019), 1(2). 
 "The Religion Singularity: The Religion Singularity: A Demographic Crisis Destabilizing and Transforming Institutional Christianity," International Journal of Religion and Spirituality in Society (2017)
 "A New Middle Way? Surviving and Thriving in the Coming Religious Realignment," Anglican Theological Review (Winter 2009/2010)
 "A Comprehensive Expectancy Motivation Model: Implications for Adult Education and Training," Adult Education Quarterly (May 1989).

References

External links
 Official website of The FaithX Project
 Official website of St. Nicholas Episcopal Church
 Official website of the Journal of Socio-Historical Exploration of Religion and Ministry
 Official website of the International Journal of Religion and Spirituality in Society

1952 births
Living people
American Episcopal clergy
American Episcopal priests